Belcourt Castle is a historic house museum in Rhode Island, United States.

Belcourt may also refer to:

Belcourt (surname)
Belcourt, North Dakota, census-designated place in Rolette County, North Dakota, United States
Belcourt, Quebec, municipality in Quebec, Canada
Belcourt Theatre, theatre in Nashville, Tennessee, United States